The Mexican climbing salamander (Bolitoglossa mexicana) is a species of salamander in the family Plethodontidae. It is found in Belize, Guatemala, Honduras, Mexico, and possibly Nicaragua. Its natural habitats are subtropical or tropical dry forests, subtropical or tropical moist lowland forests, subtropical or tropical moist montane forests, plantations, and rural gardens. It is threatened by habitat loss.

References

Bolitoglossa
Taxonomy articles created by Polbot
Amphibians described in 1854
Taxa named by André Marie Constant Duméril